Cookman is a surname. Notable people with the surname include:

Brian Cookman (1946–2005), English musician and composer, magazine designer and artist, and tai chi practitioner
Donald Cookman, Democratic politician who served in the West Virginia Senate
George Cookman Sturgiss (1842–1925), lawyer and Republican politician from West Virginia
George Grimston Cookman (1801–1841), Methodist clergyman who served as Chaplain of the Senate
John Cookman (1909–1982), American ice hockey player who competed in the 1932 Winter Olympics
Joseph Cookman (1899–1944), American journalist, writer, critic and a founder of The Newspaper Guild
William Holmes Cookman (1867–1950), American architect who was an engineer of the Pennsylvania Railroad

See also
Bethune–Cookman University, private historically black university in Daytona Beach, Florida
Bethune–Cookman Wildcats, college sports teams at Bethune-Cookman University in Daytona Beach, Florida
List of Bethune-Cookman University alumni
Darnell-Cookman School of the Medical Arts, located in downtown Jacksonville, Florida, USA, across from Shands Hospital